Re: Fraynes (later The Fraynes) is a Canadian sports talk show television series which aired on CBC Television from 1954 to 1955.

Premise
Sports personalities were interviewed in a set which resembled a recreation room. Hosts were journalists Trent Frayne and his wife June Callwood. The series was retitled The Fraynes from the 26 February 1955 episode.

Guests included Edmonton Eskimos player Norman Kwong (27 November 1954).

Scheduling
This series, approximately 15 minutes, was broadcast Saturday nights following the hockey broadcast from 16 October 1954 to 30 April 1955. The series filled network time until the newscast at 11:00 p.m..

References

External links
 

CBC Television original programming
1954 Canadian television series debuts
1955 Canadian television series endings
1950s Canadian sports television series
Black-and-white Canadian television shows